Dan Haerle (born July 23, 1937) is a jazz pianist, composer, author and teacher, based in Denton, Texas.  He is professor emeritus of Jazz Studies at the University of North Texas.

Early life and education

Dan Haerle attended Quincy High School. In 1953 he moved with his family to New York where he attended Flushing High School and graduated from Hicksville High School in 1955. In 1957 he moved to Cedar Rapids, Iowa, where he attended Coe College and graduated with a Bachelor of Music Education degree in 1961. Haerle earned a Master of Music in Composition from North Texas State University in 1966.

Career 
Haerle began teaching in 1961 at Tri-County Community Schools in What Cheer, Iowa, where he was the Instrumental music director for elementary, junior high and high school.

In 1963 to 1966, as a graduate student at North Texas State University, Dan was one of three teaching assistants to Leon Breeden, director of the jazz studies program.

In 1966, he became an Assistant Professor of Music at Kansas State University, where he taught freshman and sophomore theory.

In 1968, Haerle moved to Monterey Peninsula College,  where he was an Instructor of Music, teaching class piano, music theory, jazz history, jazz improvisation, and directing jazz ensembles

In 1971, he taught at the University of Miami in Coral Gables Florida as an Assistant Professor of Music, teaching  classical theory, jazz piano, jazz improvisation, jazz history, jazz arranging and also directed jazz ensembles

In 1973, Haerle returned to New York City to be a freelance professional.

In 1975, Haerle became an Associate Professor of Music and co-director of the Jazz Studies degree program. at Arizona State University in Tempe, Arizona.  He taught jazz piano, jazz improvisation, jazz history, jazz styles and directed jazz ensembles

In 1977, he moved to the University of North Texas in Denton, Texas as a Professor of Music.  He was appointed Regents Professor in 1992.  While there he organized the Dan Haerle Quartet, including recent graduates of the University music program.

Haerle wrote a number of instructional books about jazz performance, as well as a series of jazz/rock charts.

In 2002 Haerle retired from full-time teaching, but continued to teach private jazz piano lessons and the online jazz theory course

In 2007– he was named UNT Professor Emeritus and became a member of the adjunct teaching faculty.

As of 2015, Haerle continues to perform with his trio and quartet and offers online instruction to students around the world.

Honors 

1992 Regents Professor appointment
2003 Hall of Fame – International Association of Jazz Education
2012 LeJENd of Jazz Education – Jazz Education Network

Publications 

Jazz-Rock Voicings for the Contemporary Keyboard Player – Alfred Music
Scales for Jazz Improvisation - Alfred Music
Jazz Improvisation for Keyboard Players - Alfred Music
Jazz Tunes for Improvisation (with Matteson & Petersen) - Warner Bros
The Jazz Language – Alfred Music
The Jazz Sound – Hal Leonard
Jazz Piano Voicing Skills – JA Music 
Jazz Improvisation, A Pocket Guide – JA Music
Magic Motives - JA Music
The Essential Jazz Harmony Book - JA Music
Six compositions for jazz ensemble– Sierra Music Publications, Inc. 
Twelve compositions for jazz combo– C. L. Barnhouse Company

Discography 
"Witch Hunt (1974) – Jamey Aebersold, saxophone; Dan Haerle, piano; Rufus Reid, bass; Charlie Craig, drums
"1965...Then to Now (1994) – Pete Magadini, drums and leader; Dan Haerle electric piano; Jim Zoechler, saxophone; Dave Young, bass. Selection: My Funny Valentine, 1976
Seagulls (1978) – Dan Haerle, piano; Pete Brewer, saxophones; Bob Bowman, bass; Steve Houghton, drums
Tuba Jazz Superhorns (1978) – Rich Matteson, Ashley Alexander, Buddy Baker, euphoniums; Harvey Phillips, Dan Perantoni, Winston Morris, tubas; Jack Petersen, guitar; Dan Haerle, piano; Rufus Reid, bass; Ed Soph, drums. Selections: Spoofy, Lucky Southern
Kaleidoscope (1986) – Dan Haerle, keyboards; Pete Brewer, saxophones, flute & Lyricon; Rick Peckham, guitars; Gerald Stockton, basses; Harrell Bosarge and George Honea, drums 
Lunar Octave (1995) – Janice Borla, voice and leader; Fareed Haque, guitars; Art Davis, trumpet; Brad Stirtz, vibes; Dan Haerle, piano; Bob Bowman, bass; Jack Mouse, drums
...and into the light (1996) – Greg Waits, trombone and leader; David Liebman, saxophone; Larry Spencer, trumpet; Tim Miller, guitar; Dan Haerle, piano; John Adams, bass; Ed Soph, drums
Second Wind (1997) – Pete Brewer, sax, flute and leader; Dan Haerle, piano, Fred Hamilton, bass; Ed Soph, drums
The Truth of the Matter (1999) – Dan Haerle, keyboards; Bob Bowman, bass; Jack Mouse, drums
Kenny Wheeler at North Texas (2000) – Kenny Wheeler, trumpet and flugelhorn; Dan Haerle, piano, Fred Hamilton, guitar; Lynn Seaton, bass; Ed Soph, drums. (Available from North Texas Jazz, PO Box 304050, Denton, TX 76203)
Gentle Giants (2002) – Dan Ramsey, trumpet; John Alexander, saxophone; Dan Haerle, piano; Steve Bailey, bass; Gregg Bissonette, drums
Agents of Change (2003) – Janice Borla, voice and leader; Rich Fudoli, saxophones; Fareed Haque, guitars; Art Davis, trumpet; Brad Stirtz, vibes; Dan Haerle, piano; Bob Bowman, bass; Jack Mouse, drums
Standard Procedure (2004) – Dan Haerle, piano; Bob Bowman, bass; Jack Mouse, drums
Everybody's Songs But My Own (2005) – Dan Ramsey, trumpet; John Alexander, saxophone; Dan Haerle, piano; Steve Bailey, bass; Gregg Bissonette, drums
From Every Angle (2006) – Janice Borla, voice and leader; Art Davis, trumpet; John McLean, guitar; Dan Haerle, piano; Bob Bowman, bass; Jack Mouse, drums
Aspiration (2011) – Dan Haerle, piano; Bob Bowman, bass; Jack Mouse, drums
Live at Luminous Sound (2012) – Dan Haerle, piano; Brad Leali, saxophone; James Driscoll, bass; Ed Soph, drums
Twenty one Jamey Aebersold Playalong Recordings: Vol. 2 – Nothin' But Blues, Vol. 3 – The II/V7/I Progression, Vol. 4 – Movin' On, Vol. 5 – Time To Play Music, Vol. 7 – Miles Davis, Vol. 8 – Sonny Rollins, Vol. 10 – David Baker, Vol. 22 – 13 Favorite Standards, Vol. 30 – Rhythm Section Workout, Vol. 37 – Sammy Nestico, Vol. 41 – Body and Soul, Vol. 43 – Groovin' High, Vol. 45 – Bill Evans, Vol. 48 – In A Mellow Tone, Vol. 60 – Freddie Hubbard, Vol. 61 – Burnin, Vol. 63 – Tom Harrell, Vol. 67 – Tune Up, Vol. 71 – East of the Sun, Vol. 79 – Avalon, Vol. 109 – Fusion (Collection of Dan Haerle original tunes)

References

External links 
2011 Dan Haerle interview with Bret Primack (The Jazz Video Guy): Part 1 Part 2
Dan Haerle's Website
Dan Haerle's YouTube Playlist
Dan Haerle at allmusic.com

1937 births
Living people
People from Quincy, Illinois
American jazz pianists
American male pianists
20th-century American pianists
Jazz musicians from Illinois
21st-century American pianists
20th-century American male musicians
21st-century American male musicians
American male jazz musicians